Pam Cameron  (born 30 December 1971; formerly Lewis, née Pamela Brown) is a Unionist politician from Northern Ireland representing the Democratic Unionist Party (DUP). 

Cameron has sat in the Northern Ireland Assembly since 2011 as the Member of the Legislative Assembly (MLA) for the South Antrim constituency.

Cameron was elected to Antrim Borough Council in 2005 and was elected as the Council's first woman Mayor in 2010. Prior to her election to the Assembly, Cameron was the constituency office manager for the politician Sammy Wilson. Speaking about her election success, Cameron said: "I thought I would do well but I did not think I would get to this stage. I know there are Roman Catholics who voted for me and that I have cross-community support. I hope that continues."

Personal life
Pam is married to Michael Cameron, a Northern Ireland civil servant. The relationship was the subject of a Press Complaints Commission complaint.

References

1971 births
Living people
Female members of the Northern Ireland Assembly
Members of Antrim Borough Council
Democratic Unionist Party MLAs
Northern Ireland MLAs 2011–2016
Northern Ireland MLAs 2016–2017
Mayors of places in Northern Ireland
Northern Ireland MLAs 2017–2022
Women mayors of places in Northern Ireland
Women councillors in Northern Ireland